The 1973 Temple Owls football team was an American football team that represented Temple University as an independent during the 1973 NCAA Division I football season. In its fourth season under head coach Wayne Hardin, the team compiled a 9–1 record and outscored opponents by a total of 353 to 167. The team played its home games at Temple Stadium in Philadelphia. Dwight Fulton was the team captain.

The team's statistical leaders included Steve Joachim with 1,312 passing yards, Tom Sloan with 1,036 rushing yards, Randy Grossman with 683 receiving yards, and Henry Hynoski with 60 points scored.

Schedule

References

Temple
Temple Owls football seasons
Temple Owls football